The Prime Ministers' Corridor of Oaks is located at Faulconbridge, New South Wales, 75 km from Sydney and 20 minutes from Katoomba. It is near the Great Western Highway and Main Western railway line.  It is also near the grave of Sir Henry Parkes.  A corridor of oak trees has been planted at this place by each Prime Minister of Australia since Federation or a close family member.

Joseph Jackson (1874–1961) MLA represented the state Electoral district of Nepean for 33 years.  He donated the land on which Jackson Park sits to the people of the Blue Mountains in 1933 for use as a public park.  At that time Jackson owned the former home of Sir Henry Parkes and was an ardent admirer of his.  He conceived the idea of an avenue of oak trees to be planted by all the Prime Ministers of Australia or their nearest surviving relative.  He hoped that the avenue, growing opposite the Parkes home, would become a national memorial.  Planting commenced in 1934.

There are currently 25 oaks in the Corridor of Oaks. The park contains not only oaks but statues and park benches and is a common stop for a picnic.

References

See also

 Prime Ministers Avenue — Ballarat, Victoria

Geography of New South Wales
Prime Minister of Australia
Avenues (landscape)
Blue Mountains (New South Wales)